These are the Billboard magazine R&B singles chart number one hits of 1994:

Chart history

See also
1994 in music
List of number-one R&B hits (United States)
List of number-one R&B albums of 1994 (U.S.)

References

1994
1994 record charts
1994 in American music